Boris Yeltsin Street is a street in Yekaterinburg, Russia.

History
The street historically developed in the 1740s as one of the streets of Ssylnaya Sloboda ("settlement of the exiled"), emerging outside Zeley Gates of Yekaterinburg Fortress. Street direction reflected the line of the south side of the Yekaterinburg City Pond. On the city plan of 1810 it was marked as Ordinarnaya (Ordinary) Street, on the city plan of 1845 — Fetisovskaya (Fetisov).

Until 1845, Fetisovskaya street was quite developed, consisting of two long quarters. The street started from Metlinskaya (Metlin) Street (beginning of modern 8 Marta (8 March) Street) and approached Severnaya (North) Street. In 1919, the street was renamed Devyatogo Yanvarya (9 January) Street to commemorate the events of 9 January 1905 in Saint Petersburg.

On 8 April 2008, the street was renamed after the first president of Russia Yeltsin. On 1 February 2011, the Boris Yeltsin Monument was opened on the street near Demidov-Plaza business center.

Notable locations 
 No. 3 — Boris Yeltsin Presidential Center
 No. 6 — Iset Tower
 No. 10 — Legislative Assembly of Sverdlovsk Oblast

See also 
 Yekaterinburg-City

References

Sources
 Зорина, Л. И. (Zorina L.I.), & Слукин, В. М. (Slukin V.M.) (2005). Улицы и площади старого Екатеринбурга (Streets and squares of old Yekaterinburg). Yekaterinburg, Russia: Basko.
 Рабинович, Р. И. (Rabinovich R.I.), & Шерстобитов, С. Л. (Shestobritov S.L.) (1965). Улицы Свердловска (Streets of Sverdlovsk) (2nd ed.). Sverdlovsk, USSR: Mid-Ural Books Publishing. http://www.1723.ru/read/books/sverdlovsk-1965.htm
 Худякова, М. Ф. (Khudiakova M.F.) (2003). Улицы Екатеринбурга (Streets of Yekaterinburg). Yekaterinburg, Russia: Mid-Ural Books Publishing.

Streets in Yekaterinburg
Boris Yeltsin